Gamochaeta antillana, the delicate everlasting, is a species of flowering plant in the family Asteraceae. It is native to the Greater Antilles and to the southeastern United States (from Florida to Louisiana). It has also become naturalized in other places (South America, Europe, Australia, New Zealand, Texas, California, the Carolinas, etc.).

The plant forms many small flower heads in elongated arrays and also in tightly packed clumps. Each head contains 3–5 purple disc flowers but no ray flowers.

Gamochaeta antillana is similar to G. falcata, and many Gamochaeta antillana specimens from the eastern United States have long been misidentified as G. falcata.

References

antillana
Flora of the Southeastern United States
Flora of the Caribbean
Plants described in 1915
Flora without expected TNC conservation status